The men's 200 metre butterfly event at the 2012 Summer Olympics took place on 30–31 July at the London Aquatics Centre in London, United Kingdom.

For the second time at the 2012 Olympic Games, Michael Phelps fell short in his attempt to win the same event three consecutive times, due to a spectacular performance from South Africa's Chad le Clos. Phelps was considered a favorite to win the race, but Le Clos came from third at the final turn to edge out the superstar (and his personal hero) by five-hundredths of a second (0.05) for the gold medal and an African record in 1:52.96. By finishing with a time of 1:53.01, Phelps earned his second silver medal of the games, bringing his overall total to eighteen, and matching Larisa Latynina's record of eighteen medals as the most decorated Olympic athlete of all time. Japan's Takeshi Matsuda managed to repeat his bronze from Beijing four years earlier in 1:53.21.

Austria's Dinko Jukić, who claimed the top seed earlier in the prelims, missed the podium by over a body length with a fourth-place time and a national record in 1:54.35. U.S. swimmer Tyler Clary finished fifth in 1:55.06 to hold off a close battle from Serbia's Velimir Stjepanović (1:55.07) and Poland's three-time Olympic finalist Paweł Korzeniowski (1:55.08) by a hundredth of a second (0.01) each. China's Chen Yin rounded out the historic finale with an eighth-place time in 1:55.18.

Hungary's László Cseh missed a chance to reach the final roster and defend his Olympic silver medal after placing twelfth in the semifinals (1:55.88).

Records
Prior to this competition, the world and Olympic records were:

Results

Heats

Semifinals

Semifinal 1

Semifinal 2

Final

References

External links
NBC Olympics Coverage

Men's 00200 metre butterfly
Men's events at the 2012 Summer Olympics